Osbert Edwin Williams Jr. (December 15, 1875 – October 25, 1917) was a pioneer aviator. He started the Williams Aeroplane Company.

Biography
He was born on December 15, 1875, in Webster Township, Michigan to Osbert Edwin Williams Sr. and Sarah E. Williams (née Cook).

He was working for the railroad when he became interested in aviation. He started a flying school and aircraft manufacturing company in Scranton, Pennsylvania.

He died on October 25, 1917, in Mobile, Alabama.

Students
Many of his students died in crashes or served in World War I.
Albert Boshek (1890–1917)
Ransom A. Fowler (1889–1916)
Don McGee (1896–1917)
Harold M. Bruner
Leroy Wilson (aviator)
Lieutenant  Cyrus K. Bettis (1893–1926) served in World War I
Lieutenant  John Burns (aviator) served in World War I
Captain E. G. Knapp (?–1928) served in World War I
Lieutenant John Thad Johnson (1893–1927) served in World War I
Sid Robberts

References

External links
 Regulator for dampers and the like (1912)
Osbert Edwin Williams Jr. at Early Aviators

1875 births
1917 deaths
Businesspeople from Scranton, Pennsylvania
American aerospace engineers
Aviation history of the United States
American inventors
Aviation pioneers
Aviators from Michigan
Engineers from Pennsylvania
19th-century American businesspeople